Aqbolagh-e Humeh (also Romanized as Āqbolāgh-e Ḩūmeh; also known as Ak-Bulag, Āq Bolāgh,  Āqbulāq, Āt Bolāgh, and Kharābeh Āghbolāgh) is a village in Zanjanrud-e Bala Rural District, in the Central District of Zanjan County, Zanjan Province, Iran. At the 2006 census, its population was 718, in 159 families.

References 

Populated places in Zanjan County